Tillamook County is one of the 36 counties in the U.S. state of Oregon. As of the 2020 census, the population was 27,390. The county seat is Tillamook. The county is named for the Tillamook or Killamook people, a Native American tribe who were living in the area in the early 19th century at the time of European American settlement. The county is located within Northwest Oregon.

The Tillamook were the southernmost branch of the Coast Salish.  They were separated from their more northern kinsmen by tribes speaking the Chinookian languages.  The name Tillamook is of Chinook origin (a trade pidgin, which had developed along the lower Columbia.) According to Frank Boas, "It [Tillamook] means the people of Nekelim. The latter name means the place of Elim, or in the Cathlamet dialect, the place of Kelim. The initial t of Tillamook is the plural article, the terminal ook the Chinook plural ending —uks."  Since there was one village in the area of Nehalem bay; the area was referred to as Nekelim (Ne Elim=singular). There were at least four villages on the south Tillamook bay according to Lewis and Clark;  the south bay was called "T-Elim-ook" (the plural of Elim), meaning many villages of Elim.  (The Chinook word for water was "chuck" and the Salish word for wetland is "naslex".  The popular translation of Tillamook as meaning "land of many waters" seems to be 20th-century fabrication used in the tourist industry.)

History

Tillamook County, the 12th county in Oregon to be organized, was established on December 15, 1853, when the Territorial Legislature approved an act to create the new county out of an area previously included in Clatsop, Yamhill and Polk counties. Boundary changes were enacted with Clatsop County (1855, 1870, and 1893), Lincoln County in 1893, Washington County (1893, 1898), and Yamhill County (1887).

The Coast Range behind Tillamook was the scene of a repeated series of forest fires called the Tillamook Burn between 1933 and 1951. In 1948, a state ballot approved the sale of bonds to buy the burned-over areas and have the state rehabilitate the lands. The state lands were renamed the Tillamook State Forest by governor Tom McCall on July 18, 1973. By the end of the 20th century, the replanted growth was considered mature enough to be commercially harvested.

Naval Air Station Tillamook
The Tillamook airbase for blimps was commissioned on December 1, 1942, as U.S. Naval Air Station Tillamook. The two wooden hangars used to house these airships were decommissioned after World War II and deeded to Tillamook County. One of the hangars (Hangar B) is a national historic landmark and the location of the Tillamook Air Museum. The other hangar, (Hangar A) burned down in 1992.

The U.S. Mount Hebo Air Force Station was a Cold War air defense installation from 1956 to 1980. The large radomes protecting the radars from adverse weather effects could be seen silhouetted against the sky from most of Tillamook County.

Development along U.S. Route 101 to the north of Tillamook during the last part of the 20th century has blocked part of the flood plain of the Wilson River, contributing to repeated winter flooding in the city. Until the late 1950s there was a dredge used by the city to keep the slough's deeper.

Geography

At 3,706 feet (1130 m) in elevation, Rogers Peak is the highest point in the county and the highest in the Northern Oregon Coast Range.

Adjacent counties
 Clatsop County - north
 Washington County - east
 Yamhill County - east
 Polk County - southeast
 Lincoln County - south

National protected areas
Cape Meares National Wildlife Refuge
Nestucca Bay National Wildlife Refuge
Oregon Islands National Wildlife Refuge (part)
Siuslaw National Forest (part)
Three Arch Rocks National Wildlife Refuge

Demographics

2000 census
As of the census of 2000, there were 24,262 people, 10,200 households, and 6,793 families residing in the county.  The population density was 22 people per square mile (8/km2).  There were 15,906 housing units at an average density of 14 per square mile (6/km2).  The racial makeup of the county was 93.86% White, 0.22% Black or African American, 1.19% Native American, 0.65% Asian, 0.21% Pacific Islander, 1.89% from other races, and 1.98% from two or more races.  5.13% of the population were Hispanic or Latino of any race. 20.1% were of German, 13.3% English, 10.7% American and 8.6% Irish ancestry.

There were 10,200 households, out of which 24.6% had children under the age of 18 living with them, 54.8% were married couples living together, 7.7% had a female householder with no husband present, and 33.4% were non-families. 27.9% of all households were made up of individuals, and 12.6% had someone living alone who was 65 years of age or older.  The average household size was 2.33 and the average family size was 2.82.

In the county, the population was spread out, with 22.2% under the age of 18, 6.5% from 18 to 24, 23.5% from 25 to 44, 28% from 45 to 64, and 19.8% who were 65 years of age or older.  The median age was 44 years. For every 100 females there were 100.4 males.  For every 100 females age 18 and over, there were 98.1 males.

The median income for a household in the county was $34,269, and the median income for a family was $40,197. Males had a median income of $31,509 versus $21,555 for females. The per capita income for the county was $19,052.  About 8.1% of families and 11.4% of the population were below the poverty line, including 13.4% of those under age 18 and 8.1% of those age 65 or over.

2010 census
As of the 2010 census, there were 25,250 people, 10,834 households, and 6,930 families residing in the county. The racial makeup of the county was 91.5% white, 1.0% American Indian, 0.9% Asian, 0.3% black or African American, 0.2% Pacific islander, 3.6% from other races, and 2.4% from two or more races. Those of Hispanic or Latino origin made up 9.0% of the population. In terms of ancestry, 26.9% were German, 17.2% were English, 12.1% were Irish, and 5.2% were American.

Of the 10,834 households, 23.8% had children under the age of 18 living with them, 51.6% were married couples living together, 8.1% had a female householder with no husband present, 36.0% were non-families, and 29.1% of all households were made up of individuals. The average household size was 2.29 and the average family size was 2.79. The median age was 47.5 years.

The median income for a household in the county was $39,412 and the median income for a family was $50,779. Males had a median income of $39,019 versus $32,688 for females. The per capita income for the county was $22,824. About 12.8% of families and 16.9% of the population were below the poverty line, including 26.8% of those under age 18 and 10.2% of those age 65 or over.

2020 census
As of the 2020 census, there were 27,390 people residing in the county.

Economy

Agriculture
Dairy farming is one of the county's largest agricultural occupations. The Tillamook Cheese Factory is the county's largest business and the largest private employer.  Tillamook dairy products are available throughout the west and the rest of the country.

Timber

The state of Oregon owns 44% of the land inside the county boundaries, mostly as part of the Tillamook State Forest.  The State Forest was created as a result of the  Tillamook Burn.  The reforested burn is rapidly maturing, and there is local expectation that it will assist in the recovery of the local timber industry.  Three lumber mills currently operate in Tillamook County—one at Garibaldi, one in Tillamook, and one south of Tillamook at the former Naval Air Station.

Tourism
The county's scenic coastline, which includes four bays, nine rivers and the Pacific Ocean, helps draw visitors to the county for outdoor recreation, agritourism, and cultural experiences. U.S. Route 101, travels the length of the Oregon Coast, and brings many travelers through the county by car, recreational vehicle and bike.  The coast also provides locations for vacation homes for inhabitants of nearby Portland and the Willamette Valley. According to the 2015 Dean Runyan Travel Impacts study, tourism brings $229.4 million in visitor spending to Tillamook County.

Fishing
Fishing is a very important part of the economy. Oysters are farmed in the bay and keep the bay fairly clean. Sport fishing makes up most of the rest. With nine rivers, salmon is the biggest with nearly recovered runs as salmon had to be given away to the food bank. 
Tillamook County is the first in the continental United States to be declared ready for a tsunami.  This designation was given by the National Oceanic and Atmospheric Administration after the county paid $15,000 for 27 warning sirens and an emergency radio system. In 2012, county leaders voted to deactivate most of the sirens, in favor of more modern methods. With effort from local residents, the communities of Garibaldi and Rockaway Beach retained their sirens, which will be activated locally.

Politics
In its early history, Tillamook was a powerfully Republican county. It voted for the Republican presidential candidate in every election from Oregon statehood until 1928, even supporting William Howard Taft in 1912, when the party was divided. Since Franklin Roosevelt became the first Democrat to carry the county in 1932, Tillamook has been a bellwether county in most Presidential elections, although it did vote for losing Democrats in 1968, 1980 and 1988. Tillamook County has remained quite competitive over the last half century. Since 1968, no candidate has received over 55 percent of the vote, with the highest being Michael Dukakis in 1988. From 1992 until 2016 it  voted for the winning presidential candidate; that streak ended in 2020 with its vote for Donald Trump (however, Trump won the county with a reduced margin from 2016).

Transportation
Tillamook County Transportation District

Communities

Cities

Bay City
Garibaldi
Manzanita
Nehalem
Rockaway Beach
Tillamook (county seat)
Wheeler

Census-designated places

Barnesdale
Bayside Gardens
Beaver
Cape Meares
Cloverdale
Fairview
Hebo
Idaville
Neahkahnie
Neskowin
Netarts
Oceanside
Pacific City
Pleasant Valley

Other unincorporated communities

Aldervale
Barview
Bayocean
Brighton
Castle Rock
Dolph
Foss
Hemlock
Hobsonville
Idiotville 
Jordan Creek
Lees Camp
Manhattan Beach
Meda
Mohler
Nedonna Beach
Oretown
Sandlake
Tierra Del Mar
Twin Rocks
Watseco
Woods

Notable people

Dennis Awtrey, former National Basketball Association player
Nellie Owens (Little House on the Prairies Nellie Oleson's archetype), lived and got married here

In popular culture
Tillamook County served as the setting for the fictional town of Elk Cove in the 1987 comedy film Overboard starring Goldie Hawn and Kurt Russell.

Todd Snider released Tillamook County Jail on his 2004 album East Nashville Skyline.

Tillamook County is the location of the fictional town of Arcadia Bay in the 2015 video game Life is Strange and its 2017 prequel Before the Storm.

See also
National Register of Historic Places listings in Tillamook County, Oregon

References

External links

Tillamook County, Oregon (official website)

 
Oregon placenames of Native American origin
1853 establishments in Oregon Territory
Populated places established in 1853